Alto Verá is a district and town in the Itapúa Department of Paraguay.

Demography

The district has a total population of 13799, of which 529 lives in the urban area, according to the 2002 national census.

Location
Alto Verá is located about 60 km from Pirapó and has the following districts as a neighbors:
 North: Caazapá department (Yuty, San Juan Nepomuceno and Tavaí).
 East: Itapúa Poty district.
 South: districts of Obligado, Bella Vista and Pirapó.
 West: San Pedro del Paraná district.

References

Sources 
World Gazeteer: Paraguay – World-Gazetteer.com

Districts of Itapúa Department
Districts of Paraguay